Sherri Turner (born October 4, 1956) is an American professional golfer. She became a member of the LPGA Tour in 1984 and won three LPGA Tour events, including one major championship, during her career.

Amateur career
Turner was born in Greenville, South Carolina. She started playing golf at the age of 4. She was the 1974-75 Carolinas Junior champion. She attended Furman University, where she was a medalist at three tournaments, including the Women's Southern Intercollegiate. She was selected to the All-American Team in 1979.

Professional career 
Always one of the longest hitters on Tour, Turner joined the LPGA Tour in 1984. She won three events on the tour, including one major, the 1988 Mazda LPGA Championship. In 1988, she topped the money list and was named Female Player of the Year by Golf Writers Association of America, Golf Illustrated, Golf World, and Golf Magazine. The following year she was tenth on the money list, but from that point on her form faded, and she only finished in the top forty in two more years. In 1999, she was a runner up at the U.S. Women's Open. She also had over 100 top-10 finishes in her LPGA career.

Turner was inducted into the Furman Athletic Hall of Fame in 1989. She became the first-ever inductee into the NutraSweet Hall of Fame in 1990. She is an honorary member of the South Carolina Hall of Fame. She was a member of the LPGA Player Executive Committee from 1997-99. Turner was diagnosed with type 1 diabetes at the age of 14.

Professional wins

LPGA Tour (3)

LPGA Tour playoff record (0–2)

Legends Tour (3)
2008 BJ's Charity Championship (with Cindy Figg-Currier)
2012 Hannaford Community Challenge
2013 Swing for the Cure with Legends of the LPGA

Major championships

Wins (1)

Team appearances
Professional
Handa Cup (representing the United States): 2007 (winners), 2008 (winners), 2009 (winners), 2010 (winners), 2012 (tie, Cup retained), 2013, 2014 (winners)

External links

American female golfers
Furman Paladins women's golfers
LPGA Tour golfers
Winners of LPGA major golf championships
Golfers from South Carolina
Sportspeople from Greenville, South Carolina
1956 births
Living people
People with type 1 diabetes